The Chimanimani stream frog (Strongylopus rhodesianus) is a species of frog in the family Pyxicephalidae found in Zimbabwe and Mozambique. Its natural habitats are subtropical or tropical moist montane forest, subtropical or tropical high-altitude shrubland, subtropical or tropical high-altitude grassland, and rivers. It is threatened by habitat loss.

The type was obtained from Chirinda Forest. It is native to the Eastern Highlands and Mount Gorongosa, Mozambique.

Sources

Strongylopus
Amphibians described in 1933
Taxonomy articles created by Polbot
Fauna of the Eastern Highlands